Oakdene may refer to:

Oakdene (Baltimore, Maryland), part of the Green Spring Valley Historic District in Baltimore County, Maryland, U.S.
Oakdene (Staunton, Virginia), a historic home listed on the NHRP in Virginia
Oakdene, Gauteng, a suburb of Johannesburg, South Africa
Oakdene Place, listed on the NRHP in Floyd County, Georgia, U.S.
, a 1942 coaster